"What the Hell Have I" is a song by the American rock band Alice in Chains. It was originally featured on the soundtrack to the 1993 John McTiernan film Last Action Hero starring Arnold Schwarzenegger. The song was released as a single and peaked at No. 19 on the Billboard Mainstream Rock Tracks chart. It was included on the compilation album Nothing Safe: Best of the Box (1999). A remixed version of the song was included on the compilation albums Music Bank (1999) and The Essential Alice in Chains (2006).

Origin and recording
The song was originally written for their breakthrough album Dirt, but was shelved at the time and used later for the Last Action Hero soundtrack. Contrary to popular belief, Jerry Cantrell did not use a traditional sitar during the recording session although he did attempt to play one but was unsure how. While experimenting with sounds, he adopted a guitar-sitar into the session to achieve the sound of the opening riff.

In the liner notes of 1999's Music Bank box set collection, guitarist Jerry Cantrell said of the song:

Release and reception
"What the Hell Have I" was released to radio stations on June 7, 1993 in support of Alice in Chains' appearance on the 1993 Lollapalooza tour. The single peaked at No. 19 on the Billboard Mainstream Rock Tracks chart.

Allmusic's Jason Birchmeier said that the song is "on a par with those featured on the band's recent (and magnificent) Dirt album." Ned Raggett of Allmusic said that the song "isn't bad at all but on the flipside has little immediate surprise to offer to it."

Music video
The music video for "What the Hell Have I" was released in 1993 and was directed by Rocky Schenck, who had previously directed the "We Die Young" and "Them Bones" music videos for the band, and who would later direct the music video for "Grind". In the music video, singer Layne Staley's face is projected on him with different expressions, while guitarist Jerry Cantrell is seen with the same contact lenses with a smiley face that was worn by Mr. Benedict (played by Charles Dance) in Last Action Hero. The video is available on the home video release Music Bank: The Videos.

Track listing
 "What the Hell Have I"
 "A Little Bitter"

Personnel
Layne Staley – lead vocals
Jerry Cantrell – guitar, vocals
Mike Inez – bass
Sean Kinney – drums, percussion

Chart positions

References

External links
[ Review of "What the Hell Have I"] at Allmusic

1993 songs
1993 singles
Alice in Chains songs
Songs written by Jerry Cantrell
Atco Records singles
Music videos directed by Rocky Schenck
Columbia Records singles